Chevrolet Assembly Division was a designation applied from 1933–1965, then renamed the General Motors Assembly Division until 1980.

Plants operated under Chevrolet Assembly management prior to General Motors Assembly Division management (most established pre-1920).  Framingham, Massachusetts is unusual in that it changed from Buick-Oldsmobile-Pontiac Assembly management to Chevy management prior to becoming GMAD. 

The terminology is confusing because most plants assembled more than just Chevrolet or B-O-P, and refers to the management structure only. The five brands originated vehicles from their respective "home" plants, where vehicles were assembled locally for their respective regions. Vehicles were also produced in "knock-down" kits and sent to the branch assembly locations. The "home" branches for both Buick and Chevrolet were in were Flint, Michigan at two separate locations; Oldsmobile at Lansing, Michigan; Pontiac at Pontiac, Michigan; and Cadillac at Detroit, Michigan.

As of March 6, 2019, the only plant that remains open from the old CAD Division is the Flint Truck Assembly.

St. Louis Truck Assembly, St. Louis, Missouri
Janesville Assembly, Janesville, Wisconsin
Norwood Assembly, Norwood, Ohio
Oakland Assembly, Oakland, California
Flint Truck Assembly, Flint, Michigan
North Tarrytown Assembly, Tarrytown, New York
Buffalo Assembly, Buffalo, New York
Lakewood Assembly, Atlanta, Georgia
Leeds Assembly, Kansas City, Missouri
Baltimore Assembly, Baltimore, Maryland
Van Nuys Assembly, Los Angeles, California
Willow Run Assembly, Ypsilanti, Michigan
Framingham Assembly, Framingham, Massachusetts
Lordstown Assembly, Lordstown, Ohio

References

General Motors